In stochastic analysis, a rough path is a generalization of the notion of smooth path allowing to construct a robust solution theory for controlled differential equations driven by classically irregular signals, for example a Wiener process. The theory was developed in the 1990s by Terry Lyons.
Several accounts of the theory are available. 

Rough path theory is focused on capturing and making precise the interactions between highly oscillatory and non-linear systems. It builds upon the harmonic analysis of L.C. Young, the geometric algebra of K.T. Chen, the Lipschitz function theory of H. Whitney and core ideas of stochastic analysis. The concepts and the uniform estimates have widespread application in pure and applied Mathematics and beyond. It provides a toolbox to recover with relative ease many classical results in stochastic analysis (Wong-Zakai, Stroock-Varadhan support theorem, construction of stochastic flows, etc) without using specific probabilistic properties such as the martingale property or predictability. The theory also extends Itô's theory of SDEs far beyond the semimartingale setting. At the heart of the mathematics is the challenge of describing a smooth but potentially highly oscillatory and multidimensional path  effectively so as to accurately predict its effect on a nonlinear dynamical system . The Signature is a homomorphism from the monoid of paths (under concatenation) into the grouplike elements of the free tensor algebra. It provides a graduated summary of the path . This noncommutative transform is faithful for paths up to appropriate null modifications. These graduated summaries or features of a path are at the heart of the definition of a rough path; locally they remove the need to look at the fine structure of the path. Taylor's theorem explains how any smooth function can, locally, be expressed as a linear combination of certain special functions (monomials based at that point). Coordinate iterated integrals (terms of the signature) form a more subtle algebra of features that can describe a stream or path in an analogous way; they allow a definition of rough path and form a natural linear "basis" for continuous functions on paths.

Martin Hairer used rough paths to construct a robust solution theory for the KPZ equation. He then proposed a generalization known as the theory of regularity structures for which he was awarded a Fields medal in 2014.

Motivation
Rough path theory aims to make sense of the controlled differential equation

where the control, the continuous path  taking values in a Banach space, need not be differentiable nor of bounded variation. A prevalent example of the controlled path  is the sample path of a Wiener process. In this case, the aforementioned controlled differential equation can be interpreted as a stochastic differential equation and integration against "" can be defined in the sense of Itô. Rough paths give an almost sure pathwise definition of stochastic differential equations.

This continuity property and the deterministic nature of solutions makes it possible to simplify and strengthen many results in Stochastic Analysis, such as the Freidlin-Wentzell's Large Deviation theory as well as results about stochastic flows.

In fact, rough path theory can go far beyond the scope of Itô and Stratonovich calculus and allows to make sense of differential equations driven by non-semimartingale paths, such as Gaussian processes and Markov processes.

Definition of a rough path
Rough paths are paths taking values in the truncated free tensor algebra (more precisely: in the free nilpotent group embedded in the free tensor algebra), which this section now briefly recalls.
Let  be the truncated tensor algebra 
 where by convention .

Let  be the simplex . 
Let . Let  and  be continuous maps . 
The -variation metric is defined as

 

A continuous function  is a  -geometric rough path if there exists a sequence of paths with finite total variation  such that

Universal limit theorem
A central result in rough path theory is Lyons' Universal Limit theorem. One (weak) version of the result is the following: 
Let  be a sequence of paths with finite total variation and let

Let  be the solution to the differential equation

 

and let  be defined as

Then  converges in the -variation metric to a -geometric rough path .

Moreover,  is the solution to the differential equation

 

driven by the geometric rough path .

Concisely, the theorem can be interpreted as saying that the solution map (aka the Itô-Lyons map)  of the RDE  is continuous (and in fact locally lipschitz) in the -variation topology. Hence rough paths theory demonstrates that by viewing driving signals as rough paths, one has a robust solution theory for classical stochastic differential equations and beyond.

Examples of rough paths

Brownian motion
Let  be a multidimensional standard Brownian motion. Let  denote the Stratonovich integration. Then 

is a -geometric rough path for any . This geometric rough path is called the Stratonovich Brownian rough path.

Fractional Brownian motion

 

This limiting geometric rough path can be used to make sense of differential equations driven by fractional Brownian motion with Hurst parameter . When , it turns out that the above limit along dyadic approximations does not converge in -variation. However, one can of course still make sense of differential equations provided one exhibits a rough path lift, existence of such a (non-unique) lift is a consequence of the Lyons–Victoir extension theorem.

Non-uniqueness of enhancement
In general, let  be a -valued stochastic process. If one can construct, almost surely, functions  so that 

is a -geometric rough path, then  is an enhancement of the process . Once an enhancement has been chosen, the machinery of rough path theory will allow one to make sense of the controlled differential equation

for sufficiently regular vector fields 

Note that every stochastic process (even if it is a deterministic path) can have more than one (in fact, uncountably many) possible enhancements. Different enhancements will give rise to different solutions to the controlled differential equations. In particular, it is possible to enhance Brownian motion to a geometric rough path in a way other than the Brownian rough path. This implies that the Stratonovich calculus is not the only theory of stochastic calculus that satisfies the classical product rule

 

In fact any enhancement of Brownian motion as a geometric rough path will give rise a calculus that satisfies this classical product rule. Itô calculus does not come directly from enhancing Brownian motion as a geometric rough path, but rather as a branched rough path.

Applications in stochastic analysis

Stochastic differential equations driven by non-semimartingales
Rough path theory allows to give a pathwise notion of solution to (stochastic) differential equations of the form 

provided that the multidimensional stochastic process  can be almost surely enhanced as a rough path and that the drift  and the volatility  are sufficiently smooth (see the section on the Universal Limit Theorem). 

There are many examples of Markov processes, Gaussian processes, and other processes that can be enhanced as rough paths. 

There are, in particular, many results on the solution to differential equation driven by fractional Brownian motion that have been proved using a combination of Malliavin calculus and rough path theory. In fact, it has been proved recently that the solution to controlled differential equation driven by a class of Gaussian processes, which includes fractional Brownian motion with Hurst parameter , has a smooth density under the Hörmander's condition on the vector fields.

Freidlin–Wentzell's large deviation theory
Let  denote the space of bounded linear maps from a Banach space  to another Banach space .

Let  be a -dimensional standard Brownian motion.

Let  be the unique solution to the stochastic differential equation

 
where  denotes Stratonovich integration.    

The Universal Limit Theorem guarantees that the Itô map sending the control path  to the solution  is a continuous map from the -variation topology to the -variation topology (and hence the uniform topology).

This strategy can be applied to not just differential equations driven by the Brownian motion but also to the differential equations driven any stochastic processes which can be enhanced as rough paths, such as fractional Brownian motion.

Stochastic flow
Once again, let  be a -dimensional Brownian motion. Assume that the drift term  and the volatility term  has sufficient regularity so that the stochastic differential equation  

has a unique solution in the sense of rough path.  A basic question in the theory of stochastic flow is whether the flow map  exists and satisfy the cocyclic property that for all ,

 

  
The Universal Limit Theorem once again reduces this problem to whether the Brownian rough path  exists and satisfies the multiplicative property that for all ,

 

As in the case of Freidlin–Wentzell theory, this strategy holds not just for differential equations driven by the Brownian motion but to any stochastic processes that can be enhanced as rough paths.

Controlled rough path
Controlled rough paths, introduced by M. Gubinelli, are paths  for which the rough integral
 
 

can be defined for a given geometric rough path .

More precisely, let  denote the space of bounded linear maps from a Banach space  to another Banach space .

Given a -geometric rough path 

 
 

 

and

Example: Lip(γ) function
Let  be a -geometric rough path satisfying the Hölder condition that there exists , for all  and all ,
 
Let . Let  be an -times differentiable function and the -th derivative is  Hölder, then 

is a -controlled path.

Integral of a controlled path is a controlled path
If  is a -controlled path where , then 

  

is defined and the path

 

is a -controlled path.

Solution to controlled differential equation is a controlled path
Let  be the solution to the differential equation

Define 

where  denotes the derivative operator, then 

 

is a -controlled path.

Signature
Let  be a continuous function with finite total variation. Define

 

The signature of a path is defined to be .

The signature can also be defined for geometric rough paths. Let  be a geometric rough path and let  be a sequence of paths with finite total variation such that 

 

Then 

 

The signature satisfies Chen's identity, that

for all .

Kernel of the signature transform
The set of paths whose signature is the trivial sequence, or more precisely,

 

can be completely characterized using the idea of tree-like path.

A -geometric rough path is tree-like if there exists a continuous function  such that  and for all  and all , 

 

A geometric rough path  satisfies  if and only if  is tree-like.

Given the signature of a path, it is possible to reconstruct the unique path that has no tree-like pieces.

Infinite dimensions
It is also possible to extend the core results in rough path theory to infinite dimensions, providing that the norm on the tensor algebra satisfies certain admissibility condition.

References

Differential equations
Stochastic processes